Carlisle Market Hall is a market hall located in Carlisle, Cumbria, England. It was built between 1887-1889 for Carlisle Corporation by Arthur Cawston and Joseph Graham, both of Westminster, with ironwork manufactured by Cowans, Sheldon & Company. It is one of the few covered Victorian markets remaining in the country. It has been used as a concert venue; notable past performers include Thin Lizzy, Gillan, Status Quo, Uriah Heep, Motörhead, Rory Gallagher, Iron Maiden, Genesis, AC/DC, The Who and Gene Vincent.

The market was redeveloped in the 1990s with the number of stalls reduced and one of the two entrances to Scotch Street closed off.  The stalls are now located in the northern half (facing West Tower Street) of the hall while the rest of the building (facing Fisher Street) was at first converted into an arcade of small retail units which were never fully occupied and then replaced with a branch of Wilko on the ground floor and TK Maxx above.

References

Grade II listed buildings in Cumbria
Market halls
Former music venues in England
Grade II listed theatres
Buildings and structures in Carlisle, Cumbria
Retail markets in England